Prokino is a rural locality (a village) in Krasnoplamenskoye Rural Settlement, Alexandrovsky District, Vladimir Oblast, Russia. The population was 4 as of 2010. There is 1 street.

Geography 
Prokino is located on the Dubna River, 33 km northwest of Alexandrov (the district's administrative centre) by road. Turgenevskiye dachi is the nearest rural locality.

References 

Rural localities in Alexandrovsky District, Vladimir Oblast